The Leckie Range is a small mountain range in southwestern British Columbia, Canada, located northwest of Gun Lake between Leckie Creek and Slim Creek. It has an area of 78 km2 and is a subrange of the Chilcotin Ranges which in turn form part of the Pacific Ranges of the Coast Mountains.

See also
List of mountain ranges

References

Chilcotin Ranges